WGTH-FM is a Southern Gospel and Religious-formatted broadcast radio station licensed to Richlands, Virginia, serving the Richlands/Tazewell area.  WGTH-FM is owned and operated by High Knob Broadcasters, Inc.

References

External links
 The Sheep Online
 

1977 establishments in Virginia
Southern Gospel radio stations in the United States
Radio stations established in 1977
GTH-FM
Tazewell County, Virginia